Kwon Han-sol is a South Korean actress. She is known for her roles in dramas such as Miss Lee, She Would Never Know, Snowdrop, Extracurricular and Sh**ting Stars. She also appeared in movies The Battleship Island, Jo Pil-ho: The Dawning Rage, The Discloser and Emergency Declaration.

Filmography

Television series

Film

References

External links 
 
 

1996 births
Living people
21st-century South Korean actresses
South Korean television actresses
South Korean film actresses